Luxembourg competed at the 1956 Summer Olympics in Melbourne, Australia. 11 competitors, 10 men and 1 woman, took part in 22 events in 5 sports.

Athletics

Men's 800 metres:
 Gerard Rasquin - Round 1, 1:52.7 (4th, did not advance)

Cycling

Individual road race
Gaston Dumont — did not finish (→ no ranking)

Fencing

Four fencers, all men, represented Luxembourg in 1956.

Men's épée
 Émile Gretsch
 Édouard Schmit
 Jean-Fernand Leischen

Men's team épée
 Émile Gretsch, Jean-Fernand Leischen, Édouard Schmit, Roger Theisen

Men's sabre
 Roger Theisen

Gymnastics

Swimming

References

External links
Official Olympic Reports

Nations at the 1956 Summer Olympics
1956
1956 in Luxembourgian sport